Queen X is a 1917 American silent crime-drama film directed by John B. O'Brien and produced and released through the Mutual Film Company. Stage personality Edna Goodrich, a former wife of Nat C. Goodwin, is the star.

The film survives in the Library of Congress collection.

Cast
Edna Goodrich - Janice Waltham, Queen X
Hugh Thompson - George Evans
Lucille Taft - Miriam Evans
Dora Mills Adams - Mrs. Evans
William Wolcott - Arnold Somers
Jack Hopkins - Nippo
P. Tamato - Togo

Reception
Like many American films of the time, Queen X was subject to cuts by city and state film censorship boards. The Chicago Board of Censors required a cut of two opium den scenes, the preparing of an opium pipe, and two scenes of a party slumming in the opium den.

References

External links

1917 films
American silent feature films
1917 crime drama films
American crime drama films
American black-and-white films
Censored films
Films directed by John B. O'Brien
1910s American films
Silent American drama films
Silent crime drama films
1910s English-language films